The Fort Morgan Micropolitan Statistical Area is a United States Census Bureau defined Micropolitan Statistical Area located in the Fort Morgan area of the State of Colorado.  The Fort Morgan Micropolitan Statistical Area is defined as Morgan County, Colorado. The Micropolitan Statistical Area had a population of 27,171 at the 2000 Census. A July 1, 2009 U.S. Census Bureau estimate placed the population at 27,850.

The Fort Morgan Micropolitan Statistical Area includes the City of Fort Morgan, the City of Brush, the Town of Hillrose, the Town of Log Lane Village, the Town of Wiggins, and the unincorporated areas of Morgan County.

See also
Morgan County, Colorado
Colorado census statistical areas
Colorado metropolitan areas
Combined Statistical Area
Core Based Statistical Area
Metropolitan Statistical Area
Micropolitan Statistical Area
Table of United States Combined Statistical Areas
Table of United States Metropolitan Statistical Areas
Table of United States Micropolitan Statistical Areas
Table of United States primary census statistical areas
Census statistical areas adjacent to the Fort Morgan Micropolitan Statistical Area:
Denver-Aurora Metropolitan Statistical Area
Denver-Aurora-Boulder Combined Statistical Area
Greeley Metropolitan Statistical Area
Sterling Micropolitan Statistical Area

References

Micropolitan areas of Colorado